James B. Terrill, often identified as James Barbour Terrill (February 20, 1838 – May 30, 1864) was a lawyer and an officer in the  Confederate States Army.

He was practicing law in Warm Springs, Virginia when the American Civil War began. He joined the Confederate Army and was elected major of the 13th Virginia Infantry Regiment in May 1861. He became colonel of the regiment after the Battle of Chancellorsville on May 15, 1863. On May 30, 1864, he was killed in action at the Battle of Totopotomoy Creek or Battle of Bethesda Church, which immediately preceded the Battle of Cold Harbor during the Overland Campaign. Terrill had already been nominated to the grade of brigadier general. The Confederate Senate posthumously confirmed the appointment on May 31, 1864, to rank from June 1, 1864.

Early life
James Barbour Terrill was the son of Colonel William H. Terrill. For many years, William Terrill was the prosecuting attorney for Bath County, Virginia.

James B. Terrill was a graduate of Virginia Military Institute, class of 1858. He studied law in Lexington, Virginia at the school of the Hon. John W. Brockenbrough. Starting in 1860 and when the Civil War began, he was practicing law in Warm Springs, Virginia.

James Terrill was the brother of Confederate Private Phillip Terrill, who was killed in action at the Battle of Cedar Creek, Union General William Rufus Terrill, an 1853 graduate of the United States Military Academy at West Point, New York, who was mortally wounded on October 8, 1862 at the Battle of Perryville, and died the next day, and Emily Terrill Porterfield, the wife of Confederate Colonel George A. Porterfield.

Virginia Governor Henry A. Wise appointed Terrill a major of cavalry in the state militia in 1859. When the Virginia Secession Convention effectively took Virginia out of the Union, Terrill hurried to Harpers Ferry to report for duty.

American Civil War service
In May 1861, James B. Terrill was elected major of the 13th Virginia Infantry Regiment. The colonel of the regiment was A. P. Hill, later Lieutenant General, and the lieutenant colonel was James A. Walker, later Brigadier General. Terrill served at the Battle of First Manassas, in Jackson's Valley Campaign, during the Seven Days battles, at the Battle of Cedar Mountain, Battle of Second Manassas, Battle of Antietam, Battle of Fredericksburg, Battle of Chancellorsville, Gettysburg Campaign, the Battle of the Wilderness and the Battle of Spotsylvania Court House. He was promoted first to lieutenant colonel and then after the Battle of Chancellorsville, on May 15, 1863, he was promoted to colonel of the regiment.

Terrill was killed in action at the Battle of Totopotomoy Creek or Battle Bethesda Church in Hanover County, Virginia on May 30, 1864, a few days before the Battle of Cold Harbor, which took place about 3 or 4 miles to the south. Terrill was buried at Bethesda Church, near the battlefield, by Union troops.

Posthumous promotion
James Barbour Terrill had already been nominated to the grade of brigadier general when he was killed at the Battle of Bethesda Church. The Confederate Senate confirmed his appointment the next day, May 31, 1864, to rank from June 1, 1864.

See also

List of American Civil War generals (Confederate)

Notes

References
 Brown, Kent Masterson. Retreat from Gettysburg: Lee, Logistics, and the Pennsylvania Campaign. Chapel Hill, NC: University of North Carolina Press, 2005. .
 Eicher, John H., and David J. Eicher, Civil War High Commands. Stanford: Stanford University Press, 2001. .
 Miller, Thomas Condit and Hu Maxwell. West Virginia and Its People, Volume 3. New York, Lewis Historical Pub. Co., 1913. . Retrieved May 4, 2011.
 Sifakis, Stewart. Who Was Who in the Civil War. New York: Facts On File, 1988. .
 Walker, Charles, D. Memorial, Virginia military institute: Biographical sketches of the Graduates and Eleves of the Virginia Military Institute Who Fell in the War Between the States. Philadelphia, J. B. Lippincott & Co., 1875. . Retrieved May 28, 2011.
 Warner, Ezra J. Generals in Gray: Lives of the Confederate Commanders. Baton Rouge: Louisiana State University Press, 1959. .

Confederate States Army brigadier generals
Virginia Military Institute alumni
People of Virginia in the American Civil War
Confederate States of America military personnel killed in the American Civil War
1838 births
1864 deaths
People from Warm Springs, Virginia